The 1974 Ohio Bobcats football team was an American football team that represented Ohio University in the Mid-American Conference (MAC) during the 1974 NCAA Division I football season. In their 17th season under head coach Bill Hess, the Bobcats compiled a 6–5 record (3–2 against MAC opponents), finished in a tie for second place in the MAC, and outscored all opponents by a combined total of 249 to 211.  They played their home games in Peden Stadium in Athens, Ohio.

Schedule

References

Ohio
Ohio Bobcats football seasons
Ohio Bobcats football